Sheikh Ahmed Aref El-Zein (10 July 1884 – 13 October 1960) was a Shi'a intellectual from the Jabal Amil (جبل عامل) area of South Lebanon.  He was a reformist scholar who engaged in the modernist intellectual debates that resonated across Arab and Muslim societies in the early 20th century.  Disappointed by the lack of education and prosperity of his community under Ottoman rule, he collaborated with other local scholars on interaction with reform movements underway in Damascus, Baghdad and Cairo.  By founding the monthly magazine Al-Irfan, he is credited with bringing literary edification and news of scientific innovations to his community and others across the Arab-speaking world.  He published a weekly paper, Jabal Amil for a year, wrote several books and established the first printing press in South Lebanon.  He promoted education for both sexes in his conservative society and helped female authors by publishing their material under their real names or pseudonyms.  He was a pillar in the national Syrian-Arab movement against Ottoman rule in the later years of the Sultanate and resisted the French mandate by advocating independence for Lebanon.  He sought educational reforms and the reconciliation of Islamic values with Western ideas of liberty and democracy.

The early years 

El-Zein was born in Shhur, South Lebanon on 10 July 1884 (16 Ramadan 1301 a.h.).  There were no schools in his village so he was sent to a single-teacher school in a nearby village where he was taught reading, the Koran and basic writing skills.  His family moved to Sidon (the third largest city in Lebanon) where he attended the Rushdiya public school for four years.  At the age of 11, his father sent him to Nabatiya where he attended Al-Hamidiya religious institution and was schooled in the Arabic language.  He was tutored in Turkish and Persian and later studied Islamic Jurisprudence with the scholar Sayed Abd-al-Hussein Sharaf-El-Deen.  He returned to Sidon in 1904 where he continued his religious education and took French and English language instruction.

He spent his professional life fighting for the rights of the under-privileged in his community and exposing Lebanon's Shi'a to the brewing reformist ideas of the era and the latest innovations in science and technology.

He married his cousin Amira Ismail El-Zein in 1904.  They had three sons (Adeeb, Nizar and Zayd) and five daughters (Adeeba, Selma, Fatima, May and Azza).

He died 13 October 1960 (22 Rabi Al-Thani 1380) while on a visit to the shrine of Imam Ali Al-Rida in Kharasan, Iran.  He was buried inside the holy shrine.

Literary Contributions

His Early career 
El-Zein worked as a correspondent for several newspapers published in the Lebanese capital Beirut including Thamarat Al-Funoon, Al-Ittihad Al-Othmani, and Hadikat Al-Akhbar.

Al-Irfan 
On 5 February 1909, El-Zein published the first issue of Al-Irfan, an Arabic-language monthly "Scientific, Historical, Literary and Sociological Review." This introduced the world to the Shi’a community in Lebanon and farther afield in Iraq and Iran and debated issues of concern to Shi’a and Arabs.  The magazine was printed in Beirut for the first two years.  In 1910 El-Zein commissioned his own printing press in Sidon where the monthly was printed until the 1960s.  It was published 10 times a year until after the death of the founder’s son Nizar Al-Zein in 1981.  Afterwards, it was published quarterly until 1987 and then resumed between 1992 and 1996.

In his publication for the Center for Lebanese Studies at Oxford "Aspects of Shi’i Thought From the South of Lebanon,"  Chibli Mallat says the magazine "epitomized an era and an area," taking advantage of the 1908 Ottoman constitutional revolution and a "new atmosphere of freedom of expression started in Istanbul." He posited that the contributors to the magazine and the debates played out within its pages "reflected, and to an extent shaped, history to come," as Al-Irfan became the "point of convergence" for the Shi'a writers on politics and social affairs. Its influence can be seen in Lebanese Shi'a political and religious writings throughout the twentieth century.

Other publications 
In addition to the numerous articles (literary, fiction, political and religious) and poetry that he published in his monthly journal and in a weekly paper Jabal Amil that he published from 28 December 1911 to 5 December 1912. He wrote:

 A book: Tarikh Saida (The history of Sidon) in 1913.
 A book: Mukhtasar Tarikh Al-Shi’a (A Brief History of the Shi’a) in 1914.
 A short story, Al-Hub al-Sharif (Honest Love – A Literary Ethical Love Story) in 1921.

He also edited and published:

 Al-Wasata Bayn Al-Mutanabi wa Khosomoh (The Mediation between Al-Mutanabi and his Opponents).
 Majma’ Al-Bayan Fi Tafseer Al-Quran (The Confluence of Knowledge in the Interpretation of the Quran).

His Struggle Against Occupations and Work for Independence 

El-Zein participated in several underground Arab societies, such as Al-‘Ahd, Al-Islah, and the Al-Shabiba Al-Arabiya, opposing Ottoman rule and working for the independence of Arab nations. He supported the first Arab Congress held in Paris in 1913 seeking to reform the Ottoman Empire and open Arabs under Ottoman rule to modern civilization. In October 1914, he was chosen as Sidon’s regional representative of Jami’yat Al-Thawra Al-Arabiya (The Society for Arab Revolution), which merged with Al-Jami’ya Al-Lamarkaziya (Decentralization Society). He became responsible for recruiting members for the organization. His home and printing press became a hub for its activities, which led to his arrest and imprisonment by Ottoman authorities. He was released after a short detention but had to retreat to his farm in south Lebanon and abandoned Al-Irfan for a period of six years.

El-Zein opposed the 1920 French mandate of Lebanon under the League of Nations and participated in a national conference in Beirut in support of the Syrian Revolt. In 1925, the French authorities detained him briefly for his support of the Syrian Revolt. Continuing his resistance to the mandate authorities, he participated in several anti-occupation conferences and demonstrations. On 3 September 1936 he received a two-month jail sentence after a peaceful demonstration in front of the Government House in Sidon. During the Second World War, he moved to his farm in the south of Lebanon and Al-Irfan ceased publication from 1942–1945.

His Reformist Ideology 
Like Mohamed Abdou, the leading Egyptian intellectual reformist at the end of the 19th century, El-Zein rejected the prevailing practices that confined himself and his community to act within the limitations of religious and cultural views propagated by elites and believed in openness to other religions, cultures, and scientific ideas. Troubled by regional ignorance, political and administrative corruption, and the stagnancy of traditional religious thought, he sought to spread knowledge and promote natural sciences. He used his writings, his influence as a member in several cultural and political organizations, and participation in public forums to promote new ideas and trends in thought.

Education 
El-Zein considered learning and training as the only route for the East to reach intellectual and political liberty. He called for the adoption of a free-thinking pedagogy instead of the approach of rote memorization prevalent in traditional Islamic culture and current French practices. He stressed the importance of training and sports and advocated "exploring the powers of the brain" and developing them through "scientific principles." He preferred the Anglo-Saxon educational approach because of its promotion of the practical as opposed to the French.

Adoption of Western Values 
El-Zein rejected blind imitation of the West but encouraged informed choices of those ideals and values that could fit easily with conservative Muslim society. He worked to overcome the weakness and ignorance that kept his community from adapting necessary innovations from the West.

Women’s Status 
El-Zein believed that a major cause of backwardness and poverty in the Muslim community was tied to home life and the condition of women. He saw the cure in educating them especially since they were essential to making their children productive members of society. So Al-Irfan included a special-women’s corner that covered the lives and tribulations of accomplished women throughout history. He encouraged female writers, corresponding with them and publishing their works. He emphasized the importance of women participating in all disciplines of education including science and medicine.
Favoring the moderate approach of covering the hair but not the face to the controversial issue of veiling, El-Zein devoted extensive space in his journal to its discussion. Paralleling the thoughts of other Muslim progressives of the time in their opposition to polygamy, he emphasized the condition set in Islamic jurisprudence of fair treatment that a man can never treat more than a woman equally.

Religious Reconciliation 
Like other reformists of the era, El-Zein called for a return to the true spirit of religion with its teachings of good conduct and brotherhood. He considered all religions to be one in essence and origin even if they differed in presentation and practice. He supported the pan-Islamic movement of the era calling for unity among Muslim sects and encouraging Jami’yat Al-Taqrib Bayn Al-Mathahib Al-Islamiya (Association For Drawing Together Muslim Sects). At the time, his moderate and reconciliatory attitudes drew criticism from some Muslim and Christian personalities. Fiery media debates ensued between him and his supporters and the Local Jesuits (Al-Basheer newspaper and Father Louis Sheikho writing in Al-Mashrik), the Orientalist Jesuits (Father Henri Lammens in Al-Mashrik journal), and Sunni Muslims (Rashid Rida, a disciple of Muhammad Abduh, in his Al-Manar paper). These debates, often intense, reflected a changing social and intellectual environment as different thinkers sought to identify a common ground at a time when the region was undergoing major political and intellectual changes.

Economics and Politics 
El-Zein stressed the importance of economic independence for Arabs and was conscious of the need of his country to build factories in order to achieve self-sufficiency and economic independence as shown in an article he wrote for The Ottoman Union newspaper entitled "Factories, Factories – How Can We Be So Slow to Build." To him, no society could prosper without utilizing all its national resources and stimulating the agricultural and industry sectors.

Politically, El-Zein lived through three regimes: Ottoman, French mandate, and independence. He opposed the Ottomans and the French despite inducements by both to recruit him to their side. Reportedly, the French tried to lure him with offers of the position of education minister and modern printing equipment, which he refused. After independence as corrupting political power began influencing emerging leaders, he preferred to stay on the sidelines pushing for progress and helping the under-privileged in his community. He believed in Arab nationalism and belonged to several secret societies that opposed the Ottomans. He participated in conferences that propagated Syrian unity, which he believed would be a prelude to Arab unity as the "realistic and encompassing" future for Arabs. He strongly condemned the Balfour Declaration. He saw the 1948 Arab defeat and the establishment of Israel as severe blows which brought shame on the Arab nation with a loss of dignity rooted in the complacency of its leaders, and a lack of national awareness among its people.

Language, Journalism 
El-Zein was adamant about the proper use of the classical standard Arabic language, calling for its proper use in all instances including poetry. His advocacy sprang from a nationalist belief that protecting the language was a prelude to advancing and protecting the Arab identity. He believed that nation that "did not take care of its language was putting itself at the risk of extinction."

Journalism to El-Zein was a mission of reform with political, educational, and religious aspects. His repeated confrontations with authorities underline his commitment to the critical and scrutinizing role of the press as he understood and practiced it.

References 

Shia scholars of Islam
1884 births
1960 deaths
Burials in Mashhad
Burials at Imam Reza Shrine